Breitenbrunn is a community in the Ore Mountains in the district of Erzgebirgskreis in the Free State of Saxony in Germany.

Geography

Constituent communities 
The community consists of Breitenbrunn with Breitenhof, Carolathal, Halbemeile and Rabenberg, Antonsthal with Antonshöhe, Erlabrunn, Steinheidel and Fällbach as well as Rittersgrün and Tellerhäuser.

Neighbouring communities 
Bordering on Breitenbrunn are Johanngeorgenstadt, the health resort of Oberwiesenthal and the town of Schwarzenberg, all in the Erzgebirgskreis.

Location 
Breitenbrunn lies on a mountain ridge stretching from the Schwarzwasser Valley on east. It is surrounded by, among other mountains, the Rabenberg and the Sauberg.

History 

As the highest village in the lordly domain of Schwarzenberg, Breitenbrunn was likely founded only in the 13th century. With the help of vast meadows and sites it can be ascertained that no more than ten families settled here at first. The village had its first documentary mention as “breitinprun” in 1380 in a chronicle of the mountain counts of Leisnig when the mining rights for a tin mine had just been granted. Even before Breitenbrunn’s founding there was over the site of the later settlement a wall with a watchtower, a moat and a small outer defence to defend the Schwarzenberg lordly domain at its southernmost point. Since a spring was found within the moat, the moat was called a “broad spring”, or breiten Brunnen in German, and soon this description was taken up as the place’s name.

Of special historic importance is the Breitenbrunn Papermill found in the town, from which, among others, Johann Sebastian Bach got his notepaper.

Religion 
In Catholic times, Breitenbrunn first belonged to the Parish of Schwarzenberg. Later, a chapel consecrated to Saint Peter was built, making Breitenbrunn into a Schwarzenberg branch parish. Even after the Reformation, a dependent relationship was maintained for the time being. Now, however, Breitenbrunn was a daughter community of the newly established parish of Grünstädtel.

The village at last got its ecclesiastical independence in 1559, in which same year St. Christopher’s Church (St.-Christophorus-Kirche) was built. Chosen as the location was the village’s upper end to make the walk for churchgoers from the neighbouring, parochially united community of Rittersgrün somewhat easier, especially in the winter months.

Today, alongside the Evangelical Lutheran community of St. Christopher is an Evangelical Methodist community.

Population development 

 Data from 1999 on: Statistisches Landesamt Sachsen

Politics

Mayor 
The community’s mayor (Bürgermeister) Ralf Fischer, born in 1955, was re-elected in the latest mayoral election in June 2015.

Partnership 
  Nattheim, Baden-Württemberg

Culture and sightseeing 

 St. Christoph visitors‘ mine
 Silberwäsche Technical Museum in the constituent community of Antonsthal
 Christophoruskirche from 1559
 Memorial to the Plague Minister Wolfgang Uhle at cemetery entrance
 Hunting lodge ruins

Natural memorials 
 “Himmelswiese” natural monument near the constituent community of Halbemeile
 Preißhausbuche, a famous beech tree

Education 
Breitenbrunn is also known for its Staatliche Studienakademie Breitenbrunn (Breitenbrunn State Academy). Here roughly 300 students are taught by the dual principle in the fields of tourism economics, industry and welfare.

Sport 
 Rabenberg Sport and Education Centre (with indoor swimming pool and cross-country ski run)

Regular events 
 Church consecration festival (kermis) in the upper village on the last weekend of August

Famous people 
 Sven Hannawald, ski jumper
 Jens Weißflog, ski jumper
 Wolfgang Uhle (1512–1594), known as the “Plague Minister” of Annaberg, was minister in Breitenbrunn from 1569 to 1594.
 Christian Gottlob Wild, minister and dialect poet, died here in 1839.

References

External links 
 Community’s webpage
 Visitors’ mine

Erzgebirgskreis